La Riba is a municipality in the comarca of Alt Camp, Tarragona, Catalonia, in north-eastern Spain.

The Prades Mountains are located near this municipality. From this foundation in the 12th century, the population has several water mills, for making of flour and paper. The paper industry is still the primary economic activity.

References

 Panareda Clopés, Josep Maria; Rios Calvet, Jaume; Rabella Vives, Josep Maria (1989). Guia de Catalunya, Barcelona: Caixa de Catalunya.  (Spanish).  (Catalan).

External links

La Riba information
Government data pages 

Municipalities in Alt Camp
Populated places in Alt Camp